Warner Strategic Marketing is a record label that is part of the Warner Music Group. It specializes in compilation albums, much like sister division Rhino Entertainment Company. Unlike Rhino, it does not reissue classic albums in the WMG catalogue. WSM handles international distribution for Rhino.

Similar labels
Universal Music Enterprises - owned by Universal Music Group
Legacy Recordings - owned by Sony Music Entertainment
Collectables Records - owned by Alpha Video

Warner Music labels
Labels distributed by Warner Music Group